George Bridges may refer to:
George Bridges (politician) (c. 1762–1840), Lord Mayor of London and MP for London
 Tom Bridges (1871–1939, actual first name was George), British military officer and Governor of South Australia
George Rodney Bridges (died 1714), MP for Haslemere and Winchester
George William Bridges (1678–1751), MP for Whitchurch and Winchester
George Washington Bridges (1825–1873), American politician
George Wilson Bridges (1788–1863), writer, photographer and Anglican cleric
Sir George Talbot Bridges, 8th Baronet (1818–1899) of the Bridges baronets
George Bridges, Baron Bridges of Headley (born 1970), British politician
George Sumner Bridges (born 1950), American sociologist and president of Evergreen State College

See also

George Bridge (disambiguation)
George Brydges (disambiguation)
Bridges (disambiguation)